Ioannis Stefas (28 October 1948 – 17 July 2010) was a Greek professional footballer who played as a goalkeeper for a number of clubs including PAOK and Korinthos.

Stefas began his career with local club Korinthos. He played in the Greek first division with PAOK from 1972 to 1975, before returning to Korinthos where he finished his career.

References

External links
 

1948 births
2010 deaths
Greek footballers
PAOK FC players
Korinthos F.C. players
Association football goalkeepers
Footballers from Corinth